WECN (channel 64), branded on-air as Único TV, is a Spanish Religious television station serving eastern Puerto Rico that is licensed to Naranjito. The station is owned by Único TV Media under its licensee, Encuentro Christian Network. The station's studios are located at Carr. 167, Urb. Rexville in Bayamon and its transmitter is at Barrio Cedro Abajo in Naranjito. WECN programming was also seen on WRUA, channel 33 in Fajardo before that station switched affiliations and frequency to Tiva TV. Since September 24, 2015, WECN returns to the air, broadcasting Religious programming on channel 18.1.

History
WECN began operations in 1986; branded as Telecadena ECN or Encuentro Christian Network, better known as El Canal de Naranjito. WECN thereafter is a Religious Independent station. The station was founded by Televangelist Rafael Torres Ortega, until his death on October 16, 2015. WECN has its studios & offices located at the Iglesia El Caballero de la Cruz Building in Bayamon, Puerto Rico. in the 1990s, WIRS channel 42 in Yauco, (now operated by America CV Network) joins the network and started broadcasting religious programming, throughout the northern Puerto Rico. In 1997, WRUA channel 34 in Fajardo, started broadcasting & joins the Telecadena ECN network, changed its branding to EncuentroVision.

In 2004, Lin Media, the former owners of WAPA-TV & WJPX purchased WIRS for $50,000, leaving WECN & WRUA as the remaining religious stations.

From 2006 to 2007, WRUA operated as a standard independent station, using the Citytv branding, under license from CHUM Limited – it was the first Citytv franchise on American soil. Rogers Media discontinued the licensing for WRUA, after its acquisition of Citytv, and the station now serves as a translator for Tiva TV.

Both prior to its time as Citytv and after, WRUA was and still is a religious station.

In 2009, WECN and WRUA, changed its affiliation with teleSUR, a pan–Latin American terrestrial and satellite news television network from Venezuela. teleSUR is a public company which has various Latin American governments as its sponsors. Its sponsors are the governments of Argentina (20%), Bolivia (5%), Cuba (19%), Ecuador, Nicaragua, Uruguay (10%) and Venezuela (51%).

WECN and WRUA forces to shut down on October 22, 2014, due to financial reasons. as of 2014, WECN is  Silent, and its sale is pending to the new officers & directors under Único TV Media for $1.9 million. On March 1, 2015; WRUA returns to the air, and will become a Satellite of WVQS-LD, repeating The Retro Channel on Channel 33.1. On April 17, WRUA will become a full-time Locally owned Independent station, broadcasting Retro Music Videos on channel 33.1, just before WVQS-LD moves CTNi to 50.1 & Telemicro Internacional to WSJU-TV channel 31.1. teleSUR programming is available on Encanto TV, WVDO-LD channel 10.1 in Carolina, W20DQ-D channel 20.1 in Luquillo, W24EI-D channel 22.1 in Naranjito, W02CS-D channel 22.1 in Ponce,  W36EP-D channel 22.1 in Yauco, W20DS-D channel 28.1 in Caguas, W20DR-D channel 28.1 in Humacao, W31DV-D channel 31.1 in Guayama, W02CU-D channel 28.1 & WNTE-LD channel 36.1 in Mayaguez. Since September 24, 2015, WECN is back on the air, and will change its branding to Único TV on channel 18.1. The sale of WECN to Único TV Media was completed on September 25, 2015. On November 9, 2015, WECN will simulcast with Tiva TV on channel 18.2, showing lifestyle and health programming.

Local programs produced by WECN 

 Culto al Altísimo
 Solitón
 Óptica
 Vivencias
 Compartiendo el Pan de Vida
 El Amor que Vale
 Encuentro
 La Vida Ahora
 GPS Recalculando
 Lindo y Sabroso
 Club 700 Hoy
 Vida Dura
 Zona Verde
 Cambio de Dirección
 Diseño Perfecto
 Transformados en El
 Eres lo que Comes
 El Club del Arca
 Matrimonios con Visión
 Guía tu Cuerpo
 Atomun

Digital television

Digital channels

The station's digital signal is multiplexed:

Analog-to-digital conversion

On February 17, 2009, WECN and WRUA signed off their analog signals. Both WECN/WRUA had completed its digital transmissions, although some people had believed that WECN went digital after WRUA.

References

External links 

Television channels and stations established in 1986
Naranjito, Puerto Rico
1986 establishments in Puerto Rico
Christian television stations in Puerto Rico